There are several elite or special forces of Serbia (specijalne jedinice), either as part of the Serbian Armed Forces or Police of Serbia.

Units

Active

Defunct
  Counter-Terrorist Unit, Police, merged into SAJ
  Special Operations Unit, SDB/Police, disbanded
 Special Police Units, SDB/Police, disbanded

References

External links

 
 Specijalne jedinice